The 2000 Dura Lube 300 was a NASCAR Winston Cup Series stock car race that was held on September 17, 2000, at New Hampshire International Speedway in Loudon, New Hampshire. The race was the twenty-sixth of the 2000 NASCAR Winston Cup Series season. The pole position was won by Bobby Labonte of Joe Gibbs Racing, while Roush Racing's Jeff Burton won after leading all 300 laps. , this was the last time that a driver led every single lap in a Cup Series race.

Background
New Hampshire Motor Speedway is one of ten intermediate tracks to hold NASCAR races; the others are Atlanta Motor Speedway, Charlotte Motor Speedway, Chicagoland Speedway, and Darlington Raceway as well as Homestead Miami Speedway, Kansas Speedway, Kentucky Speedway, Las Vegas Motor Speedway, and Texas Motor Speedway. Its banking in the turns varies from two to seven degrees, while the front stretch, the finish line, and the back stretch are all banked at one degree.

After the deaths of Adam Petty and Kenny Irwin Jr. in practice session accidents at the track during the previous summer, NASCAR mandated the use of restrictor plates for the event. Because of this, Burton and Steve Park (who finished 34th at Loudon) tested at the Milwaukee Mile with restrictor plates, which had a similar layout to New Hampshire.

Another effect of Petty and Irwin's deaths is the possibility of a drivers' strike, as drivers had requested the addition of "soft walls". Eventually, the drivers stated that they would run the Dura Lube 300, although they would not be pleased with running. A variation of soft walls, the SAFER barriers, was eventually adopted in 2002, but were not added to New Hampshire until a year later.

Race
Pole-sitter Bobby Labonte lost the lead on the first lap while entering turn 1 to Jeff Burton. On lap 96, Scott Pruett crashed in turn 4, and the caution flag was flown for three laps until lap 99. The green flag flew for 101 laps until a debris caution was flown. On lap 216, Jeremy Mayfield, Mike Bliss, Ward Burton, Wally Dallenbach Jr., Dave Blaney, Rick Mast and Kevin Lepage crashed in turn 2. The green was flown again on lap 220, and the race was run under green until lap 247, in which Bill Elliott crashed on the frontstretch. Another caution was thrown for Chad Little and Steve Park's accident in turn 4 on lap 279. On lap 290, Ward Burton, Rick Mast, Jerry Nadeau, Jeff Gordon and Dale Earnhardt Jr. were involved in a crash in turn 2. The green waved for four laps from lap 294 to 297, in which the final caution was waved for Sterling Marlin's spin in turn 2. The race ended under caution, and Jeff Burton claimed his fourteenth career victory and third of the season, after leading all 300 laps. Bobby Labonte finished second, followed by Ricky Rudd, Dale Jarrett and Rusty Wallace; Jeff Gordon, John Andretti, Mark Martin, Joe Nemechek and Ken Schrader closed out the top ten.

His feat of leading every lap was the third to occur in Cup history, after Cale Yarborough accomplished it at Bristol Motor Speedway in 1973 and at Nashville Speedway in 1978. It was also the third in NASCAR history to occur at a superspeedway, with Fireball Roberts at Marchbanks Speedway in 1961, along with Yarborough's Nashville win in 1978. , Burton's accomplishment is the last such instance in the Cup Series. The closest since is Martin Truex Jr.'s 2016 Coca-Cola 600 victory in which he led 392 of 400 laps.

Standings

References

Dura Lube 300
Dura Lube 300
NASCAR races at New Hampshire Motor Speedway